Saverio Marotta  (4 September 1911 – 4 May 1943) was an Italian naval officer during World War II known for his actions in command of the torpedo boat Perseo. Previously, he had been stationed on several cruisers during the Spanish civil war and early World War II starting as an ensign and working his way up to his final rank of Lieutenant Commander. After being put in command of the Perseo in August 1942 he took part in at least two actions of note against a numerically superior foe, the defence of the D'Annunzio, and the steamer Campobasso. He was wounded in action in the defence of the Campobasso, later drowning attempting to reboard his sinking vessel, he was awarded the Gold Medal of Military Valor for his efforts in defending the Campobasso.

Biography 

Marotta was born in Falconara Marittima (Province of Ancona) on 4 September 1911. He joined the Italian Naval Academy in Livorno in 1929, and in 1933 he graduated as Ensign. In 1934 he was promoted to Sub-Lieutenant; after serving for more than a year on the light cruiser Alberico da Barbiano, in 1935 he was assigned on the heavy cruiser Trento, taking part in 1936-1937 in the naval operations related to the Spanish Civil War. He then attended the Advanced Course in Livorno and obtained the patent of fire direction officer.

After the beginning of World War II, from November 1940 to August 1942 Marotta served on the light cruiser Luigi Cadorna, where he was promoted to Lieutenant and participated in numerous combat missions in the Mediterranean. In August 1942 he was given command of the torpedo boat , carrying out numerous convoy escort missions; while in command of Perseo, he was promoted to Lieutenant Commander on 1 January 1943, and was mentioned three times in the War Bulletins. On 16 January 1943, Perseo clashed with the British destroyers Nubian and Kelvin in the Sicilian Channel, while trying to protect the freighter D'Annunzio en route from Tripoli to Italy. Despite Perseo's defense, the merchant was set afire and sunk, and the torpedo boat itself was forced to retreat after suffering heavy damage.

On the evening of 3 May 1943 Perseo sailed from Pantelleria headed for Tunis, escorting the steamer Campobasso. Around midnight, the two ships were suddenly attacked by the British destroyers Nubian, Petard and Paladin. Marotta reacted boldly to the attack and, while under heavy artillery fire, twice tried to counterattack with torpedoes, until Perseo was disabled and he himself was seriously wounded by shrapnel, losing an arm. Campobasso was also set afire and later sunk.
With his ship reduced to a helpless wreck, Marotta gave the few survivors the order to abandon ship; he then passed out from blood loss and was carried to a raft by his men. Regaining consciousness on the raft, he tried to go back aboard Perseo, but he fell into the water and drowned while trying to reboard his sinking ship. He was posthumously awarded the Gold Medal of Military Valor.

References

1911 births
1943 deaths
Italian military personnel killed in World War II
Recipients of the Gold Medal of Military Valor
Regia Marina personnel